The South Central Ohio Computer Association is a non-profit consortium of 55 public schools located in 11 southern Ohio counties.  SCOCA is a member of the Ohio Educational Computer Network.  SCOCA services its member districts as both an Information Technology Center and an Internet Service Provider.

SCOCA AS Number AS36794

External links
SCOCA's Web site
Ohio Educational Computer Network

United States schools associations
Information technology organizations based in North America